The Qiaoqi Dam is a rock-fill embankment dam on the Baoxinghe River in Baoxing County of Sichuan Province, China. The primary purpose of the dam is hydroelectric power generation. Construction on the project began in October 2002 and its 240 MW power station was commissioned in 2007. The power station is located on the north bank of the main stem Baoxing River.

See also

List of tallest dams in China
List of dams and reservoirs in China

References

Dams in China
Rock-filled dams
Dams completed in 2007
Energy infrastructure completed in 2007
Hydroelectric power stations in Sichuan